Elachista catarata is a moth of the family Elachistidae that can be found in eastern New South Wales, the Australian Capital Territory and Tasmania.

The forewings are dark bluish grey. The hindwings are dark grey.

The larvae feed on Carex appressa and Carex longebrachiata. They mine the leaves of their host plant. The frass is deposited in a dense block in the upper part of the mine. Pupation takes place outside of the mine, along the midrib of a leaf of the host plant.

References

Moths described in 1897
Endemic fauna of Australia
catarata
Moths of Australia